Henry Douglas may refer to:

Henry Douglas (American football) (born 1977), American professional football player
Henry Edward Manning Douglas (1875–1939), British soldier and recipient of the Victoria Cross
Henry Douglas (Alberta politician) (1873–1944), politician and businessman in Alberta, Canada
Henry Douglas (bishop) (1821–1875), Anglican bishop in India
Henry Douglas (sport shooter) (1882–1954), British Olympic sports shooter
Henry Douglas-Scott-Montagu, 1st Baron Montagu of Beaulieu (1832–1905), British politician
Henry Douglas (Queensland politician) (1879–1952), Australian businessman and member of the Queensland Legislative Assembly

See also
Harry Douglas (disambiguation)